Theresa Caputo (born June 10, 1967) is an American purported psychic medium, best known for her TLC reality television series Long Island Medium.

Early life 
Caputo, the daughter of Nicholas and Veronica Brigandi, was born and raised in Hicksville, New York, on Long Island. She has a brother, Michael. Their father was a volunteer firefighter and worked for the Nassau County Department of Public Works until 1980 when he was elected county water commissioner.

Career 
Caputo was on the TLC reality TV series Long Island Medium from 2011 to 2019. She is also the author of two books and tours under "Theresa Caputo Live! The Experience".

Criticism 
Several people have raised doubts about her powers, including Inside Edition and Jezebel. D. J. Grothe called on Caputo to prove her abilities, and James Randi said her claims were not true.

In April 2012, the James Randi Educational Foundation awarded Caputo its Pigasus Award, a tongue-in-cheek award that seeks to expose parapsychological, paranormal or psychic frauds. The James Randi Education Foundation has been critical of Caputo's work.

A newspaper review of Caputo's performances at the NYCB Theatre at Westbury in late 2017 concluded, "For me, this unbelievable experience was simply that: not to be believed. In my humble opinion, Caputo is a damn good performer, and she's got undeniably likable sass and charisma. I just don't think she speaks with the dead. Or she didn't the night that I saw her. But my father probably could have told you that."

Paranormal investigator Massimo Polidoro calls Caputo a "performer" and reports on an investigation done by Inside Edition and mentalist Mark Edward who attended one of her live shows in 2012. In 2013, illusionist Criss Angel offered Caputo $1 million to prove her claims.

Personal life 
On December 3, 2017, Theresa and her husband Larry Caputo jointly announced they were separating after 28 years of marriage. They have two children, who have both appeared on the show: Larry Caputo Jr. and Victoria Caputo. On June 27, 2018, Larry Caputo, who moved to Los Angeles following the separation from Theresa, announced he and Theresa were moving from separation to divorce. In December 2018, Theresa Caputo announced the divorce had been finalized.

Works and publications

See also

References

External links 
 
 

Living people
American psychics
Participants in American reality television series
People from Hicksville, New York
American spiritual mediums
1967 births